Apple TV+ is an American subscription streaming service owned and operated by Apple Inc. Launched on November 1, 2019, it offers a selection of original production film and television series called Apple Originals. The service was announced during the Apple Special Event of March 2019, where entertainers from Apple TV+ projects appeared on-stage, among them Jennifer Aniston, Oprah Winfrey and Steven Spielberg.

The service can be accessed through Apple's website and through the Apple TV app, which has gradually become available for many Apple devices and some major competing streaming devices, including some smart TV models and video-game consoles. Apple plans to expand the services' availability, and there are workarounds for subscribers whose device is not presently supported. Access is included in the Apple One subscription bundle. Most of the content is available in Dolby Vision profile 5 and Atmos.

Upon its debut, Apple TV+ was available in about 100 countries, fewer than the reported target of 150. A number of countries were excluded from service despite other Apple products being available. Commentators noted that the fairly wide initial reach of the service offered Apple an advantage over other recently launched services such as Disney+, and that because Apple distributes its own content through the service instead of distributing licensed third-party content (as, for example, Hulu does) it will not be limited by licensing issues during its expansion.

By early 2020, Apple TV+ had poor growth and low subscriber numbers relative to competing services. In the middle of that year, Apple began to license older television programs and films, attempting to stay competitive with other services, attract and retain a viewership for its original content, and convert into subscribers users who were trialling the service.

The service has become the home to critically-acclaimed content: between September 2021 and March 2022, Apple TV+ netted a Primetime Emmy Award for Outstanding Comedy Series with Ted Lasso and the Academy Award for Best Picture with CODA, whose win marked the first Best Picture win for a film distributed by a streaming service.

Apple TV+ (along with the simultaneously announced a-la-carte premium-video subscription aggregation service Apple TV Channels) is part of a concerted effort by Apple to expand its service revenues.

History

Origins
Apple had long been rumored to have an interest in beginning a streaming television service, and in 2015 entered into negotiations with various television studios and programmers to aggregate their content for a live-television streaming bundle.  Negotiations fell apart over differing views on how to value the content, lack of transparency on details, and the personality of Apple's chief negotiator, Eddy Cue.

In October 2016, Apple CEO Tim Cook was reported as saying that television is "of intense interest to me and other people here." He added that Apple has "started focusing on some original content" which he called "a great opportunity for us both from a creation point of view and an ownership point of view. So it's an area we're focused on."

Staffing
In June 2017, Apple began to take the first major steps in forming its new television unit by hiring the co-presidents of Sony Pictures Television, Jamie Elricht and Zack Van Amburg, to oversee all aspects of worldwide video programming. A few months later, in August 2017, Matt Cherniss was hired as Head of Domestic Creative Development, reporting directly to Van Amburg and Erlicht. For the rest of 2017, Apple continued to fill out its executive team for Apple TV+, with Kim Rozenfeld joining as Head of Current Programming and Unscripted, Jay Hunt joining as Creative Director for Europe, Morgan Wandell joining as Head of International Creative Development, Tara Sorensen joining as Head of Kids Programming, and Max Aronson, Ali Woodruff, Carina Walker, and Michelle Lee joining as development and creative executives.

Throughout 2019, Apple continued to build out its unscripted content team, with Molly Thompson being hired as Head of Documentaries in April 2019. Several months later, in November 2019, Kim Rozenfeld stepped down as Head of Current Programming and Unscripted to focus on producing content again with a first-look content production deal with Apple under his Half Full Productions. Cherniss took over Rozenfeld's duties overseeing current scripted programming.

Development news reports
In May 2018, it was reported that Apple was expected to start a sister project to its original content service, and begin selling subscriptions to certain video services directly via its TV application on iOS and tvOS, rather than asking Apple device owners to subscribe to those services through applications individually downloaded from Apple's application store.

In October 2018, it was reported that Apple would be distributing their future original content through a still-in-development digital video service to be located within their TV application that is pre-installed in all iOS and tvOS devices. The service was expected to feature both original content, free to owners of Apple devices, as well as subscription "channels" from legacy media companies such as HBO and Starz, which would allow customers to sign up for online-only services. Later that month, it was further reported that Apple intended to roll out the service in the United States during the first half of 2019 and that it would expand its availability to around 100 countries in the months following its initial launch.

Announcements details
On March 25, 2019, Apple held a press event to announce Apple TV+. At the event, Apple showed a teaser of its upcoming original content and formally announced some of its content, with actors and producers attached to the content appearing on stage. The announced content included Helpsters, the first series from Sesame Workshop, the producer of Sesame Street, and Oprah Winfrey's first projects for Apple TV+, including a documentary under the working title Toxic Labor about workplace sexual harassment, a documentary series about mental health as well as a revival of Oprah's Book Club as a standalone television series.

On September 10, 2019, Apple announced that Apple TV+ would launch on November 1, 2019, at $4.99 per month (with a 1-week free trial) for an account that can be shared with up to six family members. Apple also announced that they would be giving away a year of Apple TV+ for free to anyone who bought a new Apple TV, Mac, iPad, iPhone, or iPod Touch beginning that same day. Student subscribers to the monthly Apple Music service at a discounted rate also have Apple TV+ bundled in at no additional cost for the time being.

Free subscription extensions
From the start of Apple TV+ on November 1, 2019, Apple offered a free one-year subscription to anyone buying certain of its hardware products (an iPhone, iPad, Apple TV, iPod Touch, or Mac). Apple initially extended the free year that was due to end on November 1, 2020, to February 28, 2021, but then announced in mid-January 2021 that they would be extending it a second time until July 31, 2021.

In mid-June 2021, Apple added a note to their website advising customers that new users subscribing after June 30, 2021, would only receive three months of free subscription instead of the previous year.

Price increases
On October 24, 2022, Apple announced it was to increase pricing of Apple TV+ (along with Apple Music and Apple One) subscriptions in many regions. The monthly plan increased US$2 to $6.99/month, and the Annual plan increased $20 to $69/year.

Programming

During the announcement of Apple TV+, Apple announced a number of prominent names of writers, directors, and stars that will be featured in the service. Apple decided to use the very large budget set aside for the service to pay for celebrity entertainers and high-profile talent as a "catnip" to draw viewers to Apple TV+.

, five of the upcoming series had already completed production, with six more already well into filming. On September 10, 2019, Apple announced that Apple TV+ would have eight original series (seven scripted and one non-scripted) and one original documentary available at launch, with plans to launch new original content every month thereafter. Most series are expected to launch with three episodes, with a new episode being released weekly thereafter, although Apple has stated that not all series will follow this model and that some series might instead launch all at once.

Early critical reaction to the bulk of the service's programming was mixed to poor, but with commentators predicting that Apple would have time to grow into its new role as a content provider and to produce well-regarded content, especially as the free year of the service provided with many Apple product purchases would entice users to continue watching, and for some to eventually pay for a subscription, as new series are released.

COVID-19 pandemic effects 
On March 13, 2020, Apple suspended all active filming on Apple TV+ shows due to the COVID-19 pandemic, and all production on series was postponed for an undetermined period of time.

Apple's decision in mid-2020 to license large swaths of existing older content for the Apple TV+ service was viewed, in part, as buying time for its original content production during the pandemic difficulties, by keeping users engaged and in a habit of visiting the service regularly, so that a viewer base would be in place by the time new sets of Apple original content are released.

In addition, the service endeavored to gain new high-profile content, taking advantage of the COVID-19 pandemic's disruption of theatrical film releases. Among these acquisitions were the 2020 feature film Greyhound starring Tom Hanks, which was purchased from Sony for $70 million. In July 2020, the service won a heated bidding war for Emancipation, a slavery-based action-thriller starring Will Smith and directed by Antoine Fuqua. Apple paid a record $105 million for the rights, which will possibly exceed $120 million after all backend deals are completed. Apple also reportedly considered a $350 to $400 million offer for the rights to stream the James Bond film No Time to Die, which was far short of the $650 to $800 million studio MGM was willing to accept.

Chronology of celebrity partnerships and other original content and programming decisions

2017
In October 2017, following reports of sexual abuse allegations against producer Harvey Weinstein, Apple announced that they were severing ties with The Weinstein Company and cancelling a planned biopic series about Elvis Presley.

2018
In April 2018, Apple signed Kerry Ehrin to a multi-year deal to produce original content. Ehrin and Apple renewed the multi-year deal in May 2020.

In June 2018, Apple signed the Writers Guild of America's minimum basic agreement and Oprah Winfrey to a multi-year content partnership. That same month, Apple announced that they given a multi-series order to Sesame Workshop to produce various Live action and animated series as well as a single puppet-based series.

In September 2018, it was reported that Apple had decided to shelve Vital Signs, a six-episode biopic television series centering on the life of hip-hop producer and performer Dr. Dre and starring Ian McShane, Sam Rockwell, and Michael K. Williams, due to concerns about the show's content being too graphic with moments cited including characters using cocaine, instances of gun violence, and an explicit orgy scene. Reports further indicated that Apple CEO Tim Cook was taking a hands-on approach in regards to the company's Worldwide Video Unit with programming decisions reportedly being aligned to Cook's personal tastes, with a preference for family-friendly shows. Various programs in different stages of production have apparently had their content altered including the toning down of the Reese Witherspoon and Jennifer Aniston morning show drama series and the removal of crucifixes from a scene in the M. Night Shyamalan drama series. Additionally, Apple reportedly passed on a television series from comedian Whitney Cummings about the #MeToo movement because it was "too sensitive a topic." The Cummings series was ultimately put into development by Amazon Video in October 2018.

In November 2018, Apple entered into a multi-year agreement with entertainment company A24 to produce a slate of original films in partnership with their Worldwide Video Unit.

That same month, Apple signed a deal with DHX Media (now WildBrain), and its subsidiary Peanuts Worldwide, to develop and produce original programs, including new series, specials and shorts based on the Peanuts characters created by Charles M. Schulz. One of the first productions created through the deal was an original short-form, STEM-related series featuring astronaut Snoopy. Also that month, Apple signed Justin Lin, and his production company Perfect Storm Entertainment, to a multi-year overall deal to produce original television content.

2019
In January 2019, Apple signed Jason Katims, and his production company True Jack Productions, to a multi-year overall production and development deal to produce original television content. That same month, Apple signed a first look deal with Imagine Documentaries to develop non-fiction features and series. In February 2019, Harpo Productions hired Terry Wood as executive Vice President in which Wood will oversee Harpo's production of original programming for Apple as part of the multi-year agreement between Oprah Winfrey and Apple. In March 2019, it was reported that five television series commissioned by Apple had finished filming and six series would finish filming in the next few months.

On April 10, 2019, Prince Harry, Duke of Sussex, announced on Instagram that he was working alongside Winfrey on the mental health documentary series as a co-creator and executive producer.

In October 2019, Apple signed Monica Beletsky to a multi-year deal.

2020
In January 2020, Apple signed a five-year production deal with Richard Plepler, the former CEO and chairman of HBO. Under the production deal, Plepler's production company Eden Productions will create television series, documentaries and feature films exclusively for Apple TV+. Also in January 2020, Apple signed a multi-year deal with Lee Eisenberg, ahead of the premiere of his series Little America, as well as another multi-year deal with Julia Louis-Dreyfus. Louis-Dreyfus is set to develop new projects as both executive producer and star.

In May 2020, Apple signed a two-year production deal with Annie Weisman, the creator of Almost Family. As part of her deal with Apple, Weisman will create television projects exclusively for Apple TV+.

In July 2020, Apple signed a multi-year deal with The Maurice Sendak Foundation, to produce new children's television series and specials based on the books and illustrations of Maurice Sendak.

In August 2020, Apple signed a multi-year first look deal with Leonardo DiCaprio's film and television production company, Appian Way Productions. Also in August 2020, Apple signed a multi-year first look deal with Martin Scorsese's film and television production company, Sikelia Productions.

In September 2020, Apple officially acquired the film Cherry, which is directed by Anthony and Joe Russo and stars Tom Holland in the lead role, for around $40 million. It was released in theatres on February 26, 2021, before streaming exclusively on Apple TV+ on March 12.

In October 2020, Apple announced it had struck a deal with comedian and former anchor of Comedy Central's The Daily Show, Jon Stewart, to host a regular, hour-long series on topics of national interest, entitled The Problem with Jon Stewart, expected to become available beginning in fall 2021.

In November 2020, Steven Lightfoot signed a multi-year overall production deal with Apple, starting off as showrunner of the upcoming drama, Shantaram.

2021
In January 2021, Apple TV+ announced a new show called WeCrashed that follows the launch, rise, and fall of WeWork. Jared Leto and Anne Hathaway will be playing the parts of Adam and Rebekah Neumann. In addition, Apple bought the Sundance Film Festival hit CODA, about a girl who is the only person in her family who can hear, paying a festival-record $25 million for the worldwide rights to the film.

In February 2021, it was reported that Apple and Skydance Animation entered into a multi-year partnership to develop animated kids and family films and television programs. A few months prior, Apple acquired the global distribution rights to Skydance's upcoming Luck and Spellbound films.

In March 2021, Apple announced a multi-year programming partnership with Nobel Peace Prize winner Malala Yousafzai. Apple also signed a multi-year, first-look deal with Imagine Entertainment's film division, in addition to extending its first-look deal with Imagine Documentaries. Additionally, Natalie Portman and production partner Sophie Mas signed a multi-year first-look deal with Apple for television projects developed and produced under their new production company MountainA. March also brought an overall multi-year first-look deal with Tracy Oliver, reportedly worth well into the "eight-figure range".

In June 2021, Sian Heder, the director of the Apple-acquired Sundance hit CODA, signed a multi-year overall deal to exclusively write and develop series for Apple, in addition to signing a first-look deal for any films written by Heder.

In July 2021, Misha Green, the creator and showrunner of Lovecraft Country, signed a multi-year overall deal with Apple to exclusively create and develop new television series for Apple TV+. In July, Apple also signed a first-look deal with Alexander Rodnyansky's production company, AR Content, for future Russian-language and multilingual television series. Additionally, Apple signed a multi-year, first-look deal with Adam McKay's production company, Hyperobject Industries, for upcoming scripted feature films.

In October 2021, Sam Catlin signed an overall deal with Apple to develop scripted TV series for Apple TV+ under his Short Drive Entertainment.

In November 2021, John Skipper and Dan Le Batard, under their content company Meadowlark Media, signed a multi-year first-look deal with Apple to produce documentary films and unscripted series for Apple TV+. Meadowlark Media hired Deirdre Fenton as an executive director of unscripted programming to lead the relationship with Apple.

2022
In January 2022, Apple ordered to series a television continuation of the MonsterVerse produced by Legendary Entertainment. The series will see Godzilla and other various creatures appear. The same month, producer Kevin J. Walsh signed a multi-year deal to produce film and television for the streamer.

Professional sports 
In March 2022, Apple announced that they would air Friday Night Baseball, a weekly doubleheader of Major League Baseball games with live pre- and postgame shows on Apple TV+ in the United States, Canada, Australia, Brazil, Japan, Mexico, Puerto Rico, South Korea, and the United Kingdom starting in the 2022 Major League Baseball season.

In June 2022, Major League Soccer announced that Apple had acquired the global streaming rights to the league beginning in the 2023 season. All regular season and playoff matches will stream on MLS Season Pass, a subscription offering separate from Apple TV+. A package of games throughout the season will stream at no additional charge for Apple TV+ subscribers, and they will be able to receive a discount on MLS Season Pass.

Acquisition of back catalog film and TV content 
In mid-2020, Apple began discussions with film and television studios to license their previously released content as part of an effort to build a back catalog of non-original films and television shows for the streaming service. The shift was designed to help the service better compete against the large content libraries offered by competitors like Netflix. This represented a pivot for Apple, which had initially attempted to build the service entirely on original content, avoiding licensing fees to help keep monthly subscription fees low, and relying on its Apple TV Channels content partners to supply other content users wanted.

Analysts believed that the addition of older, highly re-watchable content like popular sitcoms and well liked films would help to retain the slowly growing subscriber base, while Apple continues to develop original content. The shift was also an acknowledgement of poor growth, especially relative to competing services.

The back catalog development was also seen as a move by Apple to attempt to persuade free trial users to transition into paid users as the first wave of one-year trials was scheduled to expire in November 2020.

On May 26, 2020, Apple announced their first acquisition of catalogue content would be the Fraggle Rock series. In addition to being the exclusive home of the 1983–1987 Jim Henson Company series, Apple will develop a new full length, rebooted Fraggle Rock series after the success of the Fraggle Rock: Rock On! short-form series on Apple TV+. On October 19, 2020, Apple announced the exclusive transmission rights of the various animated productions of the Peanuts franchise, withdrawing them from television after 55 years; as part of that agreement, Apple TV+ must make the major Peanuts specials available for free in short windows. After an outcry from fans of the specials, Apple sublicensed A Charlie Brown Thanksgiving and A Charlie Brown Christmas to PBS for commercial-free airing. In 2021, It's the Great Pumpkin, Charlie Brown also came to the PBS rotation. The PBS sublicensing arrangement ended prior to October 2022.

Growth and impact 
Apple has announced a number of partnerships, bundles, and initiatives to increase subscriber growth in the service.

It has included Apple TV+ in several reduced cost bundles designed to increase uptake and stickiness of subscriptions, including a bundle with Apple Music available for students, a bundle offering CBS All Access and Showtime for an additional US$9.99 monthly for TV+ subscribers, and a bundling of the service as part of the Apple One subscription package.

It has partnered with large cable television MSOs and telecommunications mobile network operators, such as Altice USA, the UK's EE, and Ireland's Eir TV, to offer those systems' customers Apple TV+ as part of a bundle, sometimes including an Apple TV 4K set-top box.

By February 2020, about 10 million people had signed up for Apple TV+. This included users who received a free one-year trial with the purchase of an Apple device, although it was estimated that less than 10% of Apple device owners eligible for the trial had activated it, perhaps out of Apple's failure to promote the service, Apple's desire to slow the uptake rate due to accounting concerns, or because of users' lack of interest in the service's perceived poor content options. About half of those 10 million users actively used the service.
In late 2020, the continuing expansion of availability of the Apple TV app to a growing number of smart TV platforms and to newer lines of PlayStation and Xbox video game consoles (specifically, the PS4 and PS5, and the Xbox One, Series S, and Series X) was seen as potentially boosting subscriber numbers for Apple TV+, including as part of Apple One subscription bundle purchases. However, Apple has created no native TV app for the Windows and Android platforms, or an official method to stream the content to Chromecast or on the Android TV platform (except for select Sony Bravia television models), leaving users of those devices to use a web browser to view Apple TV+ content, where possible, or to employ other workarounds, especially for sending Apple TV+ content to a television set. On December 16, 2020, Google announced it would add the Apple TV app to its Chromecast with Google TV device in early 2021, and to its Android TV platform by June 1, 2021; Google subsequently made Apple TV available on its Chromecast with Google TV, as well as on select Sony and TCL smart TVs running the Google TV interface, on February 18, 2021. On December 18, 2020, the British Urban Film Festival announced that it was to be the first UK film festival to host all of its official selections on the Apple TV app.

The service received several nominations for the 2021 Golden Globe Awards in both the television and film categories and was regarded as having "established an impressive track record for turning out consistently good — and sometimes great — programming for subscribers, despite offering a much, much smaller overall offering." Apple's series Ted Lasso won four Primetime Emmy Awards in 2021, including Outstanding Comedy Series, Outstanding Lead Actor in a Comedy Series (Jason Sudeikis), Outstanding Supporting Actor in a Comedy Series (Brett Goldstein) and Outstanding Supporting Actress in a Comedy Series (Hannah Waddingham).

The service is the first streaming service to win the Academy Award for Best Picture with CODA at the 94th Academy Awards.

As of March 2022, Apple TV+ is estimated to have 25 million paid subscribers and an additional 50 million viewers who access the service via promotions.

Notes

References

External links
 – official site

 
TV
Internet properties established in 2019
Internet television streaming services
Subscription video on demand services